"One" is the second international single (and lead single in the U.S.) from the Bee Gees' album, One. This was the song that returned the Bee Gees to American radio and would turn out to be their biggest US hit in the 1980s, and their last hit single to reach the US top ten. It was their first Top 10 hit since "Love You Inside Out" was #1 in June 1979. It peaked at number seven on the Billboard Hot 100 chart in September 1989, and it stayed in the Top 40 for ten weeks. It also topped the American adult contemporary chart that same month, remaining at number one for two weeks.

The track reached No. 71 in the UK Singles Chart.

Charts

Weekly charts

Year-end charts

References

Bee Gees songs
1988 songs
1989 songs
1989 singles
Songs written by Barry Gibb
Songs written by Maurice Gibb
Songs written by Robin Gibb
Warner Records singles